Dads is a 2022 Russian children's comedy-drama film directed by Armen Ananikyan, Anna Matison, Karen Oganesyan and Sergey Yudakov. It stars Dmitry Nagiyev and Sergey Bezrukov. It is scheduled to be theatrically released on February 23, 2022.

Plot 
The film will tell four stories on the theme of father's love, about how different relationships with dads are, about the fact that, despite our age, we will always remain children for our fathers.

Cast

References

External links 
 

2022 films
2020s Russian-language films
Russian children's comedy films
Russian children's drama films
Russian comedy-drama films